Ryan Trudgian (born 15 September 1983) is an English footballer who plays as a striker.

He joined Plymouth Argyle as a trainee, and progressed through the club's youth system. He made his one and only first team appearance for the club at the age of 17, on 5 May 2001 against Rochdale, coming on as a substitute for Martin Gritton after 78 minutes. After being released, Trudgian moved to the United States to study in Oklahoma. He played for Oklahoma City University while studying at the school, and after graduating he played for Springfield Demize in the USL Premier Development League.

References

1983 births
Living people
Sportspeople from Truro
English footballers
Association football forwards
Plymouth Argyle F.C. players
Springfield Demize players
English Football League players
USL League Two players